The 1958 Missouri Tigers football team was an American football team that represented the University of Missouri in the Big Seven Conference (Big 7) during the 1958 NCAA University Division football season. The team compiled a 5–4–1 record (4–1–1 against Big 7 opponents), finished in second place in the Big 7, and outscored its opponents by a combined total of 164 to 141. Dan Devine was the head coach for the first of 13 seasons. The team played its home games at Memorial Stadium in Columbia, Missouri.

The team's statistical leaders included Mel West with 642 rushing yards and 642 yards of total offense, Phil Snowden with 548 passing yards and 37 points scored, and Danny LaRose with 215 receiving yards.

Schedule

References

Missouri
Missouri Tigers football seasons
Missouri Tigers football